Robert Virgil Swift (March 6, 1915 – October 17, 1966) was an American professional baseball player, coach, manager and scout. He threw and batted right-handed.

Swift is pictured in one of the most famous photographs in American sporting history. He was the catcher for the Detroit Tigers on August 19, 1951, when St. Louis Browns owner Bill Veeck sent midget Eddie Gaedel to pinch hit during an actual MLB game. The stunt occurred in the second game of a doubleheader at Sportsman's Park, inspired by the James Thurber short story You Could Look It Up. Gaedel was allowed to bat when the Browns showed the umpires a legitimate baseball contract issued by the American League office. Swift knelt on the ground to receive pitcher Bob Cain's offerings—it is this kneeling stance that is captured in the photo—and Gaedel took a base on balls. He was immediately replaced at first base by a pinch runner and he never appeared in a big league game again.

Playing career

While Gaedel was a novice, Swift, a native of Salina, Kansas, played 14 consecutive seasons (1940–53) in the big leagues and all or parts of 22 years in professional baseball  (1934–53; 1955–56).

During his big-league career, he toiled for the Browns (1940–42), Philadelphia Athletics (1942–43) and Tigers (1944–53), appearing in 1,001 games and hitting .231. His 635 hits included 86 doubles, three triples and 14 home runs. Defensively, he recorded a .985 fielding percentage. Swift was primarily a second-string catcher, although he started 83 of the 1945 world champion Tigers' official American League games. During the seven-game 1945 World Series, however, he started only in Game 3, with Paul Richards handling that assignment in the remaining six contests.

Coaching and managing career
Swift became a coach and minor league manager immediately upon the end of his playing career, coaching for the Tigers (1953–54; 1963–66), Kansas City Athletics (1957–59), and Washington Senators (1960). During the 1959 season, Swift filled in for Kansas City manager Harry Craft when Craft missed 15 games due to illness, and the Athletics won ten straight games and went 13–2. But Swift was bypassed at season's end when the A's changed managers.

Swift was in his second stint as a Detroit coach in  when manager Chuck Dressen was felled by a mild heart attack during spring training. As acting manager, Swift led Detroit to a 24–18 record until Dressen was able to return on May 31. 

The next season, on May 16, 1966, Dressen suffered his second coronary in as many seasons. Again, Swift took the reins, but in mid-July (with the Tigers 32–25 under his command) he fell ill and was hospitalized during the All-Star game break for what appeared to be food poisoning. Tests revealed, however, that Swift was suffering from inoperable lung cancer. Coach Frank Skaff took over July 14 as the team's second acting manager and finished the campaign.

Three months after stepping aside, on October 17, Swift died in Detroit at the age of 51. (Dressen had predeceased him, on August 10.) His record in 1965–66 as an interim manager was 56–43 (.566), giving him a career record of 69–45 (.605).

References

External links

1915 births
1966 deaths
Albuquerque Dukes players
Augusta Tigers players
Baseball players from Kansas
Charleston Senators players
Deaths from cancer in Michigan
Deaths from lung cancer
Detroit Tigers coaches
Detroit Tigers managers
Detroit Tigers players
Detroit Tigers scouts
Henderson Oilers players
Kansas City Athletics coaches
Major League Baseball catchers
Major League Baseball pitching coaches
Major League Baseball third base coaches
Muskogee Tigers players
Oakland Oaks (baseball) players
Palatka Azaleas players
Philadelphia Athletics players
St. Louis Browns players
San Antonio Missions players
Seattle Rainiers players
Sportspeople from Salina, Kansas
Syracuse Chiefs managers
Washington Senators (1901–1960) coaches